Indur was a Palestinian village, located  southeast of Nazareth. The village was depopulated during the 1948 Arab–Israeli War and its inhabitants became refugees, some of whom were internally displaced. In Israel today, there are a few thousand internally displaced Palestinians who hail from Indur, and continue to demand their right of return.

Etymology
The name of this village is thought to preserve that of the ancient Canaanite city of Endor mentioned in the Bible as the place King Saul encountered a known medium.

History
In 1596, Indur was a part of the  Ottoman nahiya ("subdistrict") of Shafa under the liwa' ("district") of Lajjun with a population of 4 Muslim households, an estimated  twenty-two persons. The villagers paid a fixed tax rate of 25%  on a number of crops, including wheat, barley and olives, as well as goats and beehives;  a total of 3,000 akçe

A map by Pierre Jacotin  from Napoleon's invasion of 1799 showed the place, named as Handourah.

By the late nineteenth century, the village was made of adobe bricks, built against a steep hillside. To the east of the village there were several caves.

British Mandate era
In Ottoman era Palestine, an elementary school was founded in Indur, but closed during the British Mandate in Palestine.

According to the  1922 census of Palestine, Indur had 311 inhabitants; 310 Muslims and 1 Christian,  where the one Christian was  Orthodox.  By the  1931 census the population had increased to 445;   444 Muslims and  1 Christian, in a total of  75 houses.

Sheikh Tawfiq Ibrahim, one of the leaders of the 1936–39 Arab revolt in Palestine and an associate of  Izz ad-Din al-Qassam, was from Indur.

In the  1945 statistics  the population of  Indur was 620 Muslims,  with a total  of  12,444  dunams of land, according to an official land and population survey. Of this, 24 dunams were for citrus and bananas, 394 for plantations and irrigable land,  10,061 for cereals, while 29 dunams were built-up land.

1948, and aftermath
The village was occupied by Israel's Golani Brigade on May 16, 1948. Most of the population probably fled at the start of the battle, and several who "tried to escape" were shot. A small garrison was left, which reported that the remaining population were being expelled in the direction of Nazareth.

In 1992 the village site was described: "Many partially ruined walls still stand on the village site. Date, doum palm, fig, and almond trees grow on the village lands. The surrounding flat lands are cultivated by Israelis and the hilly lands serve as grazing area."

During the 2004 commemorations of Nakba Day held by Palestinian Arab citizens of Israel, the annual right of return march led to Indur. Jewish Israelis joined in the march and the event received coverage by Israeli cable and Arab satellite TV stations.
 
Indur's former residents and their descendants number a few thousand from among the tens of thousands of internally displaced Palestinians within Israel today.

See also
Depopulated Palestinian locations in Israel
List of villages depopulated during the Arab–Israeli conflict

References

Bibliography

External links
Welcome To Indur
 Indur, Zochrot
Survey of Western Palestine, Map 9: IAA, Wikimedia commons
The District of Nazareth at Khalil Sakakini Cultural Center
Ndoor  Dr. Moslih Kanaaneh

Arab villages depopulated during the 1948 Arab–Israeli War
District of Nazareth